Poplar River Power Station is a coal fired station owned by SaskPower, located near Coronach, Saskatchewan, Canada, approximately  from the Canada–US border.

The project to build the station was launched in the fall of 1974, with the Morrison Dam being constructed between 1975 and 1977 to provide cooling water for the station. Morrison Dam was built along the course of the East Poplar River. Work on the power house began in 1975. The single stack is 122 meters (400 ft) in height. The lignite used to power the station is supplied from the Luscar Mining Poplar River Coal Mine.

Description 

The Poplar River Power Station consists of:
one 291 net MW unit (commissioned in 1981)
one 291 net MW unit (commissioned in 1983)

The boilers are supplied by  Combustion Engineering and Babcock & Wilcox. The turbines and generators are supplied by Hitachi.

The power station was originally planned to have four 300MW units. One of the limiting factors in building a power station of that size was the water supply. To obtain enough water for four generating units, SaskPower was considering diverting other water sources towards the East Fork of the Poplar River from as far away as Lake Diefenbaker.

SaskPower's Emissions Control Research Facility (ECRF) 
The SaskPower's Emissions Control Research Facility (ECRF), is located at the Poplar River Power Station, and has the mandate to evaluates various technologies for controlling emissions.  The station has been instrumented to provide real-time sampling of flue-gasses. The ECRF facility was decommissioned in 2019.

References

External links 
  SaskPower Station Description

Coal-fired power stations in Saskatchewan
Hart Butte No. 11, Saskatchewan
SaskPower
Division No. 3, Saskatchewan